Thomas Rossman Palfrey (born 1953) is the Flintridge Professor of Economics and Political Science at the California Institute of Technology (Caltech) in Pasadena, California, and Fellow of the Econometric Society. He received his Ph.D. in Social Science from Caltech in 1981.

He has authored influential papers in the fields of political economy ("Voter Participation and Strategic Uncertainty" with Howard Rosenthal, APSR 1985), game theory ("Quantal Response Equilibria in Normal Form Games" with Richard McKelvey, GEB 1995), implementation ("Nash Implementation Using Undominated Strategies" with S. Srivastava, Econometrica 1991), and experimental economics ("An Experimental Study of the Centipede Game" with R. McKelvey, Econometrica 1992).

References

1953 births
Living people
Fellows of the Econometric Society
California Institute of Technology alumni
California Institute of Technology faculty
21st-century American economists